is a kami of mirrors in Shinto. She was regarded as an ancestral deity of Kagami zukuri no muraji (The mirror-making clans). In Japanese mythology, she created the exquisite Yata-no-kagami mirror which lures the sun goddess Amaterasu out of her cave and returns light to the world. Due to this achievement, Ishikori-dome is worshipped by makers of mirrors and stonecutters. She is worshiped as the god of casting and metalworking. She is enshrined in the Fuigo-jinja Shrine (Tennoji Ward, Osaka City), the Nakayama-jinja Shrine (Tsuyama City, Okayama Prefecture) the Kagamitsukurinimasu amaterumitama-jinja Shrine (Shiki-gun, Nara Prefecture), Iwayama-jinja Shrine (Niimi City, Okayama Prefecture).

References

External links
Ishikoridome - History of Japan Database

Japanese goddesses
Japanese mythology
Amatsukami